Super Robin Hood is a Robin Hood-themed platform game published in October 1986 by Codemasters.

The Oliver Twins developed the game for the Amstrad CPC when they were age 17; it was their first game published by Codemasters. Codemasters offered the brothers £10,000 for the game, because the company expected to sell 100,000 copies with royalties of 10p per unit sold. The twins worked on a single computer in a bedroom of their parents' house. Working in shifts, they coded for 18 to 23 hours per day; they took 30 minute breaks to allow the computer to cool. Sometimes, one brother coded on paper while the other used the computer.

The game was well-received by critics, and sold well. After Codemasters asked the brothers to produce another game, they developed Ghost Hunters, which was released in January 1987.

Codemasters reworked Super Robin Hood for the NES, although issues with Nintendo meant it was only released on the four-in-one NES cartridge Quattro Adventure. This reworked version was also released in 1993 for 8-bit and 16-bit home computers as Robin Hood: Legend Quest to avoid confusion with the original game.

References

External links

Robin Hood: Legend Quest at the Amiga Hall of Light

Let's Play Super Robin Hood by the Oliver Twins - 1986 - OliverTwins YouTube channel

1986 video games
Codemasters games
Amstrad CPC games
ZX Spectrum games
Commodore 64 games
Atari ST games
Amiga games
Nintendo Entertainment System games
Robin Hood video games
Video games scored by Allister Brimble
Video games scored by David Whittaker
Video games developed in the United Kingdom